The Freightliner Century Class is an aerodynamic sloped-hood conventional Class 8 truck that was produced by American truck manufacturer Freightliner. 

It was introduced in 1995 (as a 1996 model) to replace the FLD series, although the FLD remained in production through the 2001 model year.

The Century Class was renamed Century Class S/T (which stood for Safety and Technology) for the 2000 model year. The S/T package added a driver's side air bag and improved seat mounting restraints. 

The Century Class S/T was also offered with a Driver's Lounge and Backpack option. The Backpack option was an added fiberglass hump added to the outside of a rear cab sleeper model that provided additional interior storage space between the bunks.

The 2005 model year brought a facelift, with larger "jeweled" headlamps in a redesigned headlight housing, redesigned front grille with larger horizontal bars, and a redesigned front bumper with the optional round fog and driving lights now recessed, as well as optional chrome trim around the headlights, and a more aerodynamic overall profile.

The Century Class became Freightliner's flagship model when the FLD ended production in 2001.

When the Freightliner Columbia was introduced for 2002, the Century Class remained the flagship model, as the Columbia was marketed primarily as a fleet truck, while the Century Class was intended more for the owner-operators.

The Century Class remained in production in the United States until 2010 when it was formally replaced by the newly designed Cascadia. It was discontinued in its export markets in 2020 in favor of the Columbia CL112 remaining in production, with the Century’s former position as the more high end conventional truck model being taken over by the Cascadia, which also replaced the Argosy cabover.

Gallery

References

External links
 Official Australian website
 Official American legacy website

Century Class
Class 8 trucks
Tractor units
Vehicles introduced in 1995